Eduard Adorno (31 October 1910 – 28 December 2000) was a German politician of the Christian Democratic Union (CDU) and former member of the German Bundestag.

Life 
In 1961 he became a member of parliament for the constituency of Wangen/Tettnang/Ravensburg. He was a member of the German Bundestag from 1961 until his resignation on 21 August 1972. He always entered the Bundestag as a directly elected representative of the Ravensburg constituency.  From November 1965 to 19 April 1967, Adorno was Deputy Chairman of the CDU/CSU parliamentary group in the Bundestag. On 19 April 1967 he was appointed Parliamentary State Secretary to the Federal Minister of Defence in the Federal Government led by Chancellor Kurt Georg Kiesinger.

Literature

References 

1920 births
2000 deaths
Members of the Bundestag for Baden-Württemberg
Members of the Bundestag 1969–1972
Members of the Bundestag 1965–1969
Members of the Bundestag 1961–1965
Members of the Bundestag for the Christian Democratic Union of Germany
Parliamentary State Secretaries of Germany
Knights Commander of the Order of Merit of the Federal Republic of Germany
Recipients of the Order of Merit of Baden-Württemberg